Thomas Lydwell Eckersley FRS (27 December 1886 – 15 February 1959) was an English theoretical physicist and engineer.

Biography

Eckersley was born in St John's Wood, London, the second of three sons of William Alfred, a civil engineer, and Rachel, fifth child of Thomas Henry Huxley. After early years in Mexico, he attended Bedales School from age 11, where he became very interested in mathematics. Then, at 15, he went to University College London, to read engineering. He discovered that the subject was not for him, and was awarded a second class degree. He joined the  National Physical Laboratory (NPL), where he worked on the behaviour of iron under the influence of alternating magnetic fields.

He left the NPL in 1910 to read mathematics at Cambridge, and gained a BA degree in 1912. After a short time in the Cavendish Laboratory he left to join the Egyptian Government Survey as an Inspector (1913-14). When war started he took a commission in the Royal Engineers and worked on problems of wireless telegraphy. As a result, he developed a keen interest in the propagation of radio waves which was to remain with him for the rest of his life. In 1919 he joined Marconi's Wireless Telegraph Company Ltd, as a theoretical research engineer, and remained with them until he retired in 1946. A key piece of work in which he was involved was the analysis of the findings of the research team sent to Australia by the Marconi company to study long-wave propagation. The results were published in a classic paper.

In 1940 Eckersley joined the staff of the Air Ministry for secret work and in 1942 became Chief Scientific Adviser to the Interservice Ionosphere Bureau, established at the Marconi Research and Development Laboratories at Great Baddow. His contribution to radar techniques were important, especially in improving the radar detection of submarines.

He became a Fellow of the Royal Society in 1938 and was awarded the Faraday Medal of the Institution of Electrical Engineers in 1951.

Family

Thomas Lydwell Eckersley married Eva Amelia Pain, daughter of Barry Pain, the author;  on 14 April 1920 at All Saints Church, St John’s Wood. They had three children: Noel, Sylvia and Shirley.

Eckersley suffered from multiple sclerosis following his retirement. He died at Manor House, Danbury, Essex on 15 February 1959, of pneumonia contracted during an epidemic of influenza.

References

1886 births
1959 deaths
Alumni of University College London
Alumni of Trinity College, Cambridge
Engineers from London
English physicists
Fellows of the Royal Society
Huxley family
Deaths from pneumonia in England
People associated with radar
People educated at Bedales School
Telecommunications in World War II